The Women's Irish Open is a professional golf tournament on the Ladies European Tour (LET), held in the Republic of Ireland. 

The tournament became part of the LET schedule in 1994 and ran for ten editions through 2003. After a four-year hiatus, the tournament was revived again in 2008 as part of the buildup to the 2011 Solheim Cup, scheduled for late September at Killeen Castle in County Meath. Killeen Castle hosted the Ladies Irish Open in early August, the week following the Women's British Open. Last played in 2012, the tournament returned in 2022, now held at Dromoland Castle in County Clare.

At St. Margaret's in 1995, Laura Davies recorded a 72-hole total of 267 (−25), 16 strokes clear of runner-up Åsa Gottmo, setting world records for the lowest aggregate score and the biggest margin of victory in women's professional golf.

Multiple winners are Sophie Gustafson (1998, 2000, 2003, 2010), Suzann Pettersen (2008, 2011) and Laura Davies (1994, 1995).

Winners

Source:

See also
Northern Ireland Ladies Open
Irish Open

References

External links
Ladies Irish Open - official site
Ladies European Tour - official site

Irish Open
Golf tournaments in the Republic of Ireland
Recurring sporting events established in 1994
1994 establishments in Ireland